Obelisk of São Paulo (in Portuguese: Obelisco de São Paulo) or Obelisk of Ibirapuera (in Portuguese: Obelisco do Ibirapuera) is an obelisk in Ibirapuera Park in the city of São Paulo, Brazil.

This monument is a symbol of the Constitutionalist Revolution of 1932, and the biggest monument of the city of São Paulo. The height of the monument is 72 meters (236 ft 3 in). The construction of the monument was started in 1947 and completed in 1970.

The obelisk is a project of the Italo-Brazilian sculptor Galileo Ugo Emendabili, who arrived at Brazil in 1923. The obelisk, made with pure travertine marble, was inaugurated on July 9, 1955, one year after the inauguration of Ibirapuera Park.

See also
 Obelisco de Buenos Aires

References
 Obelisco do Ibirapuera: Prefeitura e Estado unidos em prol do restauro 
Ibirapuera Park Official website.. Managed by Ibirapuera Park Management Council, it allows civil society to interact with Park's Administration.

Monuments and memorials in São Paulo
Obelisks
Public art in Brazil
Buildings and structures completed in 1970